Zawieprzyce  is a village in the administrative district of Gmina Spiczyn, within Łęczna County, Lublin Voivodeship, in eastern Poland.

Landmarks 
Zawieprzyce is home to a large Baroque palace complex from 17th century. The main palace building, orangerie and some other structures are ruined already, while some other buildings like the chapel, granary or the obelisk are still standing.

References

Villages in Łęczna County